Vicksburg is a census-designated place in La Paz County, Arizona, United States. Its population was 418 as of the 2020 census. The community was named for Victor E. Satterdahl, who applied for its post office and served as the first postmaster once it opened in 1906.

Demographics

References

Census-designated places in La Paz County, Arizona